Reinaldo Armas Enguaima (born August 4, 1953), better known as Reynaldo Armas, is a Venezuelan llanero singer and composer.

Discography
 La inspiración del poeta
 Cantor, poeta y pintor
 A usted
 No hay mal que dure 100 años
 Todo un señor
 En el bicentenario de Bolívar
 El amor más grande
 Pa' los muchachos
 Romántico
 A quien pueda interesar
 Mi credo
 Romance campesino
 Pa' que te acuerdes de mi
 Con mucho sentimiento
 El serenatero
 El amor y la vida
 Colosal
 Aquí está en cardenalito
 Genesis
 La manzana
 Reflexiones del año 2000
 Tu cantante favorito
 Copla, verso y canto
 El caballo de oro
 El vuelo
 El campeón
 Romántico Enamoramiento
 Látigo en mano
 La muerte del Rucio Moro
 Yo también quiero cantar
 La flor de la amistad
 El indio
 Entre muchachas y guarachas

See also
 Venezuelan music

References 
Reynaldo Armas - sanmartinmeta.com
Reynaldo Armas - Elbrollo.com
Biografía Reynaldo Armas - Buenamusica.com]
 - ¿Quién es Reynaldo Armas, por Jorge Agobian]

1953 births
Living people
People from Guárico
Venezuelan composers
Male composers
Venezuelan folk singers